Madha is a city in the municipal council of Madha, in Solapur district in the Indian state of Maharashtra. It belongs to Solapur Division . It is located 70 km towards North-West from district headquarters Solapur. Madha is also known for the Madheshawari temple, situated near Mankarna river. The historic temple of Lord Vitthal is in Madha City. Madha Fort built by Raje Nimbalkar is a big attraction in the city.

See also 
 Madha (Lok Sabha constituency)
 Madha Taluka
 Madha (Vidhan Sabha constituency)

References 

Cities and towns in Solapur district
Talukas in Maharashtra